Pakuonis is a small town in Prienai district municipality, Lithuania. It is located near the Neman River. According to 2011 census, it has population of 608.

The village was first mentioned in 1744. The first church was built in 1792 or 1794 and the town began to grow around it. On April 23, 2004 town coat of arms, depicting a blooming apple tree, was approved by a presidential decree.

Gallery

References
 

Towns in Lithuania
Towns in Kaunas County